Veljko Filipović (born 11 October 1999) is a Serbian footballer who plays for Chiangmai in Thailand.

External links
 
 

1999 births
Living people
Association football defenders
Serbian footballers
FK Borac Čačak players
FK Javor Ivanjica players
FK Sinđelić Beograd players
Veljko Filipovic
Veljko Filipovic
Veljko Filipovic
Sportspeople from Čačak
Serbian First League players